Hugh Smithwick (July 6, 1918 – December 4, 1990) was an American football player and coach. He was the head college football coach for the Portland State Vikings located in Portland, Oregon.  He held that position for three seasons, from 1959 until 1961. His coaching record at Portland State was 6–17–2.

Head coaching record

References

1918 births
1990 deaths
American football tackles
Nevada Wolf Pack football coaches
Nevada Wolf Pack football players
Portland State Vikings football coaches
University of Nevada, Las Vegas faculty
People from Erick, Oklahoma
Players of American football from Compton, California
Coaches of American football from California